This is a list of the municipalities in the province of Soule, which is located in Basque Country and part of Pyrénées-Atlantiques département.

Soule is the smallest historical province of the Basque Country. It is divided into 3 parts:
 Cantons of the arrondissement (district) of Oloron-Sainte-Marie (Mauleon-Licharre and Tardets-Soraluce)
 A part of the canton of Saint Palais (arrondissement of Bayonne)
 7 municipalities of the canton de Saint-Palais (and a part of the municipality of Pagolle).

Soule